These quarterbacks have started at least one game for the Tampa Bay Buccaneers of the National Football League. They are listed in order of the date of each player's first start at quarterback for the Buccaneers. Through the 2020 season, the Buccaneers have had 39 different starting quarterbacks since their inaugural season in 1976.

Regular season

Number of games started is listed in parentheses.

Postseason
Here is a list of Buccaneers starting quarterbacks during the postseason and the number of games they started.

Most games started
These quarterbacks have the most starts for the Buccaneers in regular season games.
Stats through the 2022 NFL season.

Team career passing records 
(Through the 2022 NFL Season)

References

External links
 Tampa Bay Buccaneers Encyclopedia
 Tampa Bay Buccaneers All Time Roster
 Tampa Bay Buccaneers All Time Leaders

Tampa Bay Buccaneers

quarterbacks